Edmund Roberts may refer to:

Edmund Roberts (diplomat) (1784-1836), US diplomat to the Far East
Edmund Robert Harris (c. 1804–1877), English lawyer
Edmund Roberts Larken (1809–1895), English cleric and socialist